Lalit Kumar Deb Barma is a politician from Tripura, India.

In 2013 assembly elections, he represent 47- Ambassa constituency in Dhalai district in Tripura Legislative Assembly. He is the elder brother of present MLA Parimal Debbarma.

References

Tripura politicians
People from Dhalai district
Living people
Year of birth missing (living people)
Place of birth missing (living people)